Sir David de Lindsay (died 1214), Lord of Crawford and Ercildum (now Earlston), known as "the elder" to distinguish him from his son, was an Anglo-Scottish baron of the 12th and 13th century.

Life
Lindsay was the eldest son of William de Lindsay and Aleanora de Limesay. David held the position of Justiciar of Lothian, a post which his father had once held, with Gervase Avenel from 1208 until his death in 1214.

Marriage and issue
He married Marjorie, said to be an illegitimate daughter of Henry, Earl of Huntingdon, however more chronologically likely to have been an illegitimate daughter of David, Earl of Huntingdon, they are known to have had the following issue:
David de Lindsay (died 1240), married Christiana de Limesi, without issue.
Gerard de Lindsay (died 1249), succeeded his brother, without issue.
Alice de Lindsay, married Henry de Pinkeney, heiress of her brothers, with issue.

Citations

References
 Barrow, G.W.S., "The Justiciar", The Kingdom of the Scots, (Edinburgh, 2003), pp. 68–111.
 
 
 

People from East Lothian
Scoto-Normans
13th-century Scottish people
David
1214 deaths